Diego Gabriel Raimondi (born 27 December 1977 in Buenos Aires) is a former Argentine footballer. He is currently working as Diego Alonso's assistant in charge of Uruguay.

Career
Raimondi moved to Italy in 2001–02, joining Serie D club Casarano after two seasons in Argentina with Club Atlético Atlanta. He signed for Eccellenza side Gallipoli in 2003, and helped his side to win two consecutive promotions. In 2006, he joined Pisa of Serie C1, where he obtained a personal third consecutive promotion, this time to Serie B. He was the former Pisa captain. After the bankrupt of Pisa, he joined Perugia. As Perugia was excluded from professional football in 2010, Raimondi found himself again without a contract, and successively signed for another third-division club, Cosenza. This experience lasted only a few months, as Raimondi agreed for a comeback at Pisa in January 2011.

Coaching career
After 5 games for Pontedera, Raimondi moved back to Chile and became the assistant manager under Christian Díaz at Deportes Iquique. He left alongside manager Díaz in March 2013.

On 25 June 2015, it was confirmed that Raimondi had been appointed as the manager of Sestri Levante. He was in charge of the team the whole season, before he became a part of new manager Siniša Mihajlović' technical staff at Torino in the summer 2016. He was going to function as a technical collaborator. In the beginning of January 2018, Siniša Mihajlović was fired but however, Raimondi stayed at the club and continued under new manager Walter Mazzarri.

On 29 January 2019, Siniša Mihajlović became the manager of Bologna and once again brought Raimondi with him as a part of his staff. He was going to function as a technical collaborator again.

Following Diego Alonso's appointment as new Uruguay head coach, Raimondi was named as one of his two assistants in charge of the Celeste. He officially left Bologna on 2 January 2022.

References

External links
 Guardian statistics

1977 births
Living people
Footballers from Buenos Aires
Association football defenders
Argentine footballers
Argentine expatriate footballers
Serie B players
Club Atlético Atlanta footballers
A.S.D. Gallipoli Football 1909 players
Pisa S.C. players
A.C. Perugia Calcio players
Cosenza Calcio players
Expatriate footballers in Italy
Argentine expatriate sportspeople in Italy